Leonid Konstantinovich Artamonov (25 February 1859 – 1 January 1932) was a Russian military engineer, adviser and general, geographer and traveler, explorer of Africa, writer, veteran of the First World War and the Russo-Japanese War.

Biography
Leonid Artamonov, was born in the Ananyevsky Uyezd of Kherson Governorate on February 25, 1859. He studied in the Michailovsky Cadet School, then Artamonov after his graduation from the Military Engineering-Technical University in 1883, he also graduated from the General Staff Academy.

In 1897, he was a member of the Russian diplomatic mission to Ethiopia, where he became a military adviser of Negus Menelik II. During 1897–1898, he became a military aide of Menelik during his efforts to modernise the Ethiopian military, which included hiring European experts to provide training to the Ethiopian army. Artamonov was one of a contingent of Russian officer volunteers attached to the forces of Ras Tessema, and joined the expedition of the Ethiopian army to the White Nile and provided assistance during their conflicts with Sudanese forces. He was eventually discharged and returned to Russia, where he enlisted in the Russian Army around the outbreak of the First World War.

He was viewed as one of the best Russian military experts of Russia, a competent analyst with combat experience and a strong military and engineering education. But his performance at the Battle of Tannenberg against German forces did not live up to this reputation.

After Artamonov returned to Russia, he became a member of the Russian Geographical Society. He wrote a book Through Ethiopia to the White Nile about his experiences in Ethiopia. He described in detail the democratic experiments of Menelik II in the traditional patriarchal public dialog of the Ethiopian monarchy with its own people, similar to the later speeches of U.S. president Franklin Delano Roosevelt.

In 1899, for his feats and courage he was awarded the Order of the Star of Ethiopia.

He was the leader of group of military analysts and editor of their collected analyses on the Anglo-Boer War, 1899–1902.

He was the commander of the fortresses of Vladivostok (1906) and Kronstadt (1907).

From 1911 until 1914, he was the commander of the First Russian Army Corps. At the Battle of Tannenberg (1914), his corps was to protect the left wing of the 2nd Russian Army. He withdrew his forces without informing his commander Samsonov which contributed to the Russian defeat. For this error, he was relieved of command on August 28. 
 
After 1917, he continued his scientific, engineering and military activity for the Soviet government. In 1927, he was the expert of the Moscow city government. The state gave him an honorable pension. He preferred to live in Saint Petersburg, there he died in 1932.

Writings 

 Kantselson I. S. Preface // Artamonov L. K. Through Ethiopia to the White Nile. Moscow. 1979.

Awards 

 Order of the Ethiopian Star
 Order of St. Vladimir
 Orders of St. Anna all degrees
 Order of St. Alexander Neva
 Order of White Eagle
 Order of St. Stanislas
 Personal gold weapon about bravery

See also
Russian people in Ethiopia
 Nikolay Leontiev
 Alexander Bulatovich
 Nikolay Gumilev

Notes

References
 Russian Army - Leonid Artamonov
 Диссертация "Российско-эфиопские дипломатические и культурные связи в конце XIX-начале XX веков"

1859 births
1932 deaths
People from Ananyevsky Uyezd
Russian nobility
Russian explorers
Russian geographers
Russian military engineers
Military personnel of the Russian Empire
Explorers of Africa
Military Engineering-Technical University alumni
Academic staff of Military Engineering-Technical University
Russian military personnel of the Russo-Japanese War
Russian military personnel of World War I
Recipients of the Gold Sword for Bravery
Recipients of orders, decorations, and medals of Ethiopia